Insane Speed is a steel roller coaster at Janfusun Fancyworld in Taiwan. Sometimes known as Crazy Coaster on the park's website, or Floorless Coaster, as the sign in front of the ride's queue announces, the ride in Chinese is known as 衝瘋飛車. Insane Speed has two trains numbered 1 and 2, but the park usually only uses one on off-peak days due to the extremely low number of riders in the queue. Insane Speed has a removable metal floor in the station which collapses after the train has loaded and the restraints have been checked, allowing the air gates to open and the trains to depart. The floor rises again to let the next train unload once it has come to a complete stop. For restraints, riders have a simple over-the-shoulder restraint with grab bars mounted on them, and a seat belt which must be inserted into a catch mounted on the restraint.

Ride experience
The trains are dispatched right up the 131 foot lift hill. Once riders reach the top, they enter B&M's signature pre-drop element and there is a jolt as the train disengages the chain and goes into a small banked turnaround. Riders then plunge down a steep drop and the train enters a vertical loop, then go through a dive loop which turns them back 180 degrees towards where they had just come from and swoop dangerously close past the queue path as the drop down and do a 180-degree banked turnaround to the left through the loop. The train then exits a trim brake and rises to the right where riders will experience airtime as they are yanked down another drop towards the interlocking corkscrews. The train turns through a corkscrew to the right, then turns 180 degrees left and enter the second corkscrew to the right. Finally, riders enter a 4-G double helix to the right and pull into the brakes as the camera flash goes off at the end of the brake run. The riders will then make a left turn into the block brakes and switch track and return to the station once the line ahead is cleared.

See also
 Janfusun Fancyworld

2001 establishments in Taiwan
Janfusun Fancyworld
Roller coasters in Taiwan
Roller coasters introduced in 2001
Floorless Coaster roller coasters manufactured by Bolliger & Mabillard